Stepnoy is a rural locality (a settlement) in Kirovsky Selsoviet, Loktevsky District, Altai Krai, Russia. The population was 1 as of 2013. There is 1 street.

Geography 
Stepnoy is located 13 km east of Gornyak (the district's administrative centre) by road. Kirovsky is the nearest rural locality.

References 

Rural localities in Loktevsky District